My Dark Places is an album by the Television Personalities, released in 2006.

Track listing
All tracks composed by Daniel Treacy
"Special Chair" – 3:03
"All the Young Children on Crack" – 3:13
"Sick Again" – 2:15
"Ex-Girlfriend Club" – 4:18
"Dream the Sweetest Dreams" – 2:48
"Velvet Underground" – 3:21
"My Dark Places" – 3:00
"I'm Not Your Typical Boy" – 3:51
"You Kept Me Waiting Too Long" – 4:27
"They'll Have to Catch Us First" – 2:14
"She Can' Stop Traffic" – 3:43
"Tell Me About Your Day" – 3:00
"Then a Big Boy Came and Knocked It All Down" – 4:57
"I Hope You're Happy Now" – 2:31
"No More I Hate You's" – 2:47
"There's No Beautiful Way to Say Goodbye" – 3:47

Personnel
Daniel Treacy
Ed Ball
Mathew Sawyer
Victoria Yeulet

With:
Gerard Bennett
John Bennett
Alison Cotton
Simon Trought
Graeme Wilson

References

2006 albums
Domino Recording Company albums
Television Personalities albums